Etta Wedell Mastbaum (September 6, 1886 – November 1, 1953) was an American philanthropist, department store executive, art collector, and director of a national chain of motion picture theaters.

Biography
Born Etta Lit Wedell to a Jewish family on September 6, 1886, in Philadelphia, the daughter of Rachel Lit and Philip M. Wedell. Her mother founded the original store that became Lit Brothers in 1891. Etta attended the Philadelphia Seminary for Women. While traveling in Europe in the 1920s, she and her husband were intrigued by sculptor Auguste Rodin which led to a lifetime of collecting his works which eventually became the 2nd largest after Rodin's personal collection. The French government permitted them to remove the works from France subject to the condition that they works are exhibited in a permanent structure open to the public. The Mastbaums built the Jacques Gréber and Paul Cret designed Rodin Museum in Philadelphia. After the death of her husband in 1926, Mastbaum donated the collection to the people of Philadelphia in her husband's honor. She also donated a bronze cast of Rodin's Gates of Hell to France which resulted in her being decorated by the government of France. She assumed control of her husband's company Stanley Company of America and served as an executive of her family's company Lit Brothers.

Mastbaum served as a second vice president of the Mastbaum Loan System, a not-for profit dedicated to providing financial assistance to the poor. She was also an active donor to the American Red Cross and Emergency Aid of Philadelphia.

Personal life
On January 19, 1904, Maustbaum married theatre owner Jules Mastbaum; they had three daughters: Louisette "Billie" Mastbaum Wolf Dickson, Margery "Peggy" Mastbaum Solomon, and Elizabeth Mastbaum. Mastbaum died at the age of 67 on November 1, 1953 in Manhattan. She  was a member of Congregation Mikveh Israel in Philadelphia.

References

1866 births
1953 deaths
Jewish American philanthropists
Mastbaum family